David VIII (Georgian: დავით VIII; 1273–1311), from the Bagrationi dynasty, was King of Georgia in 1292–1302 and 1308-1311.

Eldest son of Demetre II the Self-sacrificing by his Trapezuntine wife, he was appointed by the Ilkhan ruler Gaikhatu as king of Georgia as reward for his military service during the Rümelian uprising in 1293. Succeeding his cousin Vakhtang II, David's rule actually extended only over the eastern part of the kingdom, whereas western Georgia had been under the Imeretian branch of the House of Bagrationi since 1259.

In 1295, he supported Baidu Khan in an internal conflict in the Ilkhanate. However, Baidu was killed and Ghazan became a khan. Ghazan ordered the Georgian king to arrive to his capital Tabriz. Remembering the fate of his father, David refused to comply and began preparations for war. Ghazan Khan responded with a punitive expedition, and ravaged the country. Supported by the Mongols, Ossetes attacked Shida Kartli province and occupied the Liakhvi River gorge. David entrenched himself in the Mtiuleti mountains and defeated a large Mongol force in a desperate guerilla fighting at Tsikare. Then, the Khan declared him deposed and appointed David's younger brother Giorgi V as king in 1299.

Although backed by the Mongol forces, the power of Giorgi did not extend out of the Georgian capital Tbilisi, and the Khan replaced him by another brother, Vakhtang III, in 1302. The new king led a Mongol army against David, but could not penetrate deeply into the largely mountainous provinces held by the rebels, and a truce was negotiated. David was recognized as joint sovereign with his brother and received the princedom of Alastani in the southern province of Javakheti. He developed friendly relations with the Egyptian Mamluks, the traditional rivals of the Ilkhanate, and, mediated by Byzantium, achieved the restoration of the Monastery of the Cross in Jerusalem to the Georgian Orthodox and Apostolic Church in 1305.

David was married twice, first to the Mongol princess Oljath, and then to a daughter of the Georgian nobleman Hamada Surameli. He was succeeded by his son Giorgi VI the Little in 1311.

Coinage 
Two types of coins issued in David's name survive, silver and copper coins, stuck in 1297 and 1310, respectively. The gap between these two periods is filled with the emissions of David's brother Vakhtang III.

Ancestry

References

 Limper, B.	Die Mongolen und die christlichen Völker des Kaukasus - Eine Untersuchung zur pol. Geschichte Kaukasiens im 13. und beginnenden 14. Jh. Diss. Köln    1980
 Lang, D. M.	Georgia in the Reign of Giorgi the Brilliant (1314–1346) BSOAS 17/1      S 74-91 London 1955
 Kapanadse,D. G.	Gruzinskaja Numizmatika Moskau 1955

External links
დავით VIII (in Georgian)

Kings of Georgia
1273 births
1311 deaths
Eastern Orthodox monarchs
Bagrationi dynasty of the Kingdom of Georgia